Mrčkovac is a village in the municipality of Golubac, Serbia. According to the 2002 census, the village had a population of 328 people.

References

Populated places in Braničevo District